Heteropolypus is a genus of soft corals in the family Alcyoniidae.

Species
Species in the genus include:
Heteropolypus insolitus Tixier-Durivault, 1964
Heteropolypus japonicus (Nutting, 1912)
Heteropolypus ritteri (Nutting, 1909)
Heteropolypus sol Molodtsova, 2013
Heteropolypus steenstrupi (Wright & Studer, 1889)

References

Alcyoniidae
Octocorallia genera